Beverly is an unincorporated community and census-designated place in Beverly Township, Adams County, Illinois, United States.

The village was founded in 1836 by a pioneer group.  The village is named after the town of Beverly, Massachusetts. A post office called Beverly was established in 1837, and remained in operation until 1955.

Geography 

Demographics
As of the 2020 census there were 72 people, 48 households, and 48 families residing in the CDP. The racial makeup of the CDP was 100.00% White. Hispanic or Latino of any race were 2.78% of the population.

References

Unincorporated communities in Adams County, Illinois
Unincorporated communities in Illinois
1836 establishments in Illinois